Clifton Historic District may refer to:

Clifton and Greening Streets Historic District, Camden, Arkansas, listed on the NRHP in Ouachita County, Arkansas
Clifton Historic District (Louisville, Kentucky), listed on the NRHP in Jefferson County, Kentucky
Clifton-McCraken Rural Historic District, Versailles, Kentucky, listed on the NRHP in Woodford County, Kentucky
Baltimore East/South Clifton Park Historic District, Baltimore, Maryland, listed on the NRHP in Maryland
Clifton Heights Historic District, Natchez, Mississippi, listed on the NRHP in Adams County, Mississippi 
Clifton Avenue Historic District (Cincinnati, Ohio), listed on the NRHP in Ohio
Clifton Historic District (Clifton, Virginia), listed on the NRHP in Fairfax County, Virginia

See also
Clifton (disambiguation)